PUVA-induced acrobullous dermatosis is a cutaneous condition characterized by the sudden occurrence of tense blisters, usually on the distal extremities, during long-term PUVA therapy

See also 
 PUVA keratosis
 List of cutaneous conditions

References 

Skin conditions resulting from physical factors